Walter Brit ( alternatively Brit, Brytte, or Brithus) (fl. 1390), was a fellow of Merton College, Oxford, and the reputed author of several works on astronomy and mathematics, as well as of a treatise on surgery. He has also been described as a follower of John Wycliffe, and as author of a book, De auferendis clero possessionibus.

Lollard identification issue
In the 17th century, Anthony Wood identified Brit with Walter Brut, a layman of the diocese of Hereford, whose trial before Bishop Thomas Trevenant of Hereford in 1391 is related by John Foxe. Current scholarship regards the matter as still open, however.

Foxe prints the articles of heresy with which Brut was charged, the speech in which he defended himself, and his ultimate submission of his opinions to the determination of the church. Thirty-seven articles were then drawn up and sent to the University of Cambridge to be confuted. Brut, however, appears to have escaped further molestation.

Attribution of scientific writings
The work most frequently cited as Brit's is the Theorica Planetarum, which bears his name in two manuscripts in the Bodleian Library (Digby, xv. ff. 58 b-92, and Wood, 8 d, f. 93); it has also been claimed for Simon Bredon. Pederson considers it as Brit's.

The latter has been repeatedly confounded with the Theorica indifferently assigned by the bibliographers to Brit and Bredon.

Another treatise mentioned by John Bale as the composition of Brit is the Theoremata Planetarum, which Thomas Tanner cites as that existing in the Digby MS. exc. f. 190 b (now f. 169 b). This manuscript dates from about the year 1300, and the work is by Johannes de Sacrobosco.

Finally, the Cirurgia Walteri Brit named in the ancient table of contents in another Digby MS. (xcviii. f. 1 b) has nothing corresponding to it in the volume itself but a set of English medical receipts whose author is not stated (f. 257).

Notes

External links
The Bodleian Library: Digby manuscripts

Year of birth missing
Year of death missing
English surgeons
Fellows of Merton College, Oxford
14th-century English mathematicians
14th-century English astronomers
14th-century English medical doctors
14th-century English writers
14th-century Latin writers